Taylor's Education Group is an education holdings company based in Selangor, Malaysia that operates throughout South-East Asia. It currently holds several for-profit K-12 schools and high-education institutions, as well as a Hostel management business that manages accommodation for students who study away from home. The company currently headed by Group Executive Chairman & CEO Dato' Loy Teik Ngan. 

The K-12 private schools owned by the group are:
 Nexus International School, Singapore
 Nexus International School, Putrajaya 
 Garden International School, Kuala Lumpur 
 Garden International School, Kuantan 
 Australian International School, Malaysia 
 Taylor's International School, Kuala Lumpur 
 Taylor's International School, Puchong

The group also owns Taylor's University, Taylor's College and Quantum Education.

References

Education companies of Malaysia
Privately held companies of Malaysia
Holding companies of Malaysia